

1900s

1900 
International Encyclopaedia and Dictionary (1900) - a descendant of the Popular Encyclopedia or Conversations Lexicon (1841)
International dictionary and cyclopaedia (1901)
Imperial Dictionary and Cyclopaedia (1901)
New Popular Encyclopaedia British ed. (1901), based on  Blackie's Modern Cyclopaedia of Universal Information (1889) itself based on Popular Encyclopedia or Conversations Lexicon (1841)
Modern Encyclopaedia of Universal Information British ed. (1906)
XXth century Cyclopaedia and Atlas (1901) - a reissue of New Cabinet Cyclopaedia and Treasury of Knowledge (1891), itself based on Blackie's Modern Cyclopaedia of Universal Information (1889)
New Twentieth Century Cyclopaedia (1903)
New and Complete Universal Self-Pronouncing Dictionary (1905)
New Cosmopolitan Encyclopaedia (1906)
National Encyclopedia of Reference (1912)
The Nuttall Encyclopædia (1900)
Standard American Book of Knowledge (1900) - a reissue of Standard Cyclopedia (1897)
20th Century Cyclopedia of Universal Knowledge (1901)
World's Book of Knowledge (1901)
New Century Cyclopedia of Universal Knowledge (1902)
American Educator and Library of Knowledge (1902)
Standard Library of Knowledge (1904)
Student's Cycopaedia (1900)
Student's Reference Work (1903)
New Student's Reference Work (1909)
How and Why Library (1913) This was a supplement to the above that, in 1934, was acquired by another company and spun off into a new work. Later incorporated into Childcraft.
Modern American Encyclopedia (1934)
Universal Cyclopaedia (1900) - a reissue of Johnson's New Universal Cyclopaedia (1876)
Universal Reference Library (1900)  a reissue of Universal Cyclopaedia and Dictionary edited by Charles Morris (1898)
Twentieth Century Encyclopedia (1901)
Imperial Reference Library (1901)
Current Cyclopedia of Reference (1909)

1901 
Century Dictionary and Cyclopedia (1901) - a reissue of the Century Dictionary (1889)
Current Encyclopedia (July 1901 - April 1902?) an attempt at a "periodical" reference work. Later merged with Progress to form The World To-Day.
Handy Cyclopedia of Common Things and Biographical Dictionary (1901)
Twentieth Century Cyclopedia of Practical Knowledge (1901)
Hill's Practical Encyclopedia (1901)
School Library Encyclopedia (1901)
Hill's Practical Reference Library (1902)
New Practical Reference Library (1907)
American Educator (1919)
Dominion Educator (1919) Canadian ed.
New General Encyclopedia (1935) Canadian ed.
Popular Compendium of Useful Information (1901) a one volume reference work edited by Charles Smith Morris
Twentieth Century Cyclopedia of Useful Information (1901)
World Encyclopaedia (1901)
Golden Treasury of Useful Information (1902)
Worlds Best Information and How to Use It (1902)
Home Cyclopedia of Useful Knowledge (1902)
Home Educator in Necessary Knowledge (1905)
Everybody's Encyclopedia for Everyday Reference (1907)
Cyclopedia, Dictionary and Atlas of the World (1909)

1902 
Anglo-American Encyclopedia and Dictionary (1902) - an unauthorized reprint of portions of the Encyclopedia Britannica with an unrelated dictionary attached. (Link includes vols. 2-4, 6-9, 11-12)
New American Comprehensive Encyclopedia (1906) (Link includes vols. 1, 3 and 4)
Century Book of Facts (1902) a quasi-annual one volume work
Universal Manual of Ready Reference (1904) 
New Century Book of Facts (1909) 
Collier's New Encyclopedia (1902)
University Encyclopaedia of Twentieth Century Knowledge (1902)
Encyclopedia Americana (1902)
New International Encyclopedia (1902)
Teacher's and Pupil's Cyclopaedia (1902)
Encyclopedic Current Reference (1906)
New Teacher's and Pupil's Cyclopaedia (1910)
Unrivaled Encyclopedia (1911)
Practical American Encyclopedia (1911)
International Reference Work (1923)
Progressive Reference Library (1928)
World Scope Encyclopedia (1945)
New World Family Encyclopedia (1953)
Standard International Encyclopedia (1953)
New American Encyclopedia (1964)
World University Encyclopedia (1964)
World Educator Encyclopedia (1964)

1903 
Crown Encyclopaedia and Gazetter (1903) (Link includes vols. 1 and 5)
Continental Encyclopedia (1905)
New Century Reference Library  (1907) (Link includes vols. 2-8)
Current Cyclopedia of Reference (1909)
Everybody's Encyclopedia (1910)
People's Encyclopedia (1914)
New World Wide Encyclopedia (1918)
World Wide Encyclopedia (1919)
New World Encyclopedia (1919) (Link includes vol. 1)
Adair's New Encyclopedia (1923) (Link includes vols. 2-5)
Time's Encyclopedia and Gazetteer (1929)
Twentieth Century Encyclopedia (1930)
Worlds Popular Encyclopedia (1937)
Imperial Encyclopedia and Dictionary (1903), a continuation of Columbian Cyclopaedia (1899)
New Imperial Encyclopedia and Dictionary (1906)
United Editors Encyclopedia and Dictionary (1909)
United Editors Perpetual Encyclopedia (1911)
New People's Cyclopedia of Universal Knowledge (1903) (Link includes vols. 1-4) re-issue of People's Cyclopedia of Universal Knowledge (1883)
World Wide Encyclopedia and Gazetteer (1908)
Twentieth Century Household Library (1903)

1904 
Cassells Cabinet Cyclopedia (1904)
Complete Library of Universal Knowledge (1904)
New Idea Self-Instructor (1904)
The Knowledge Book (1915)
The Knowledge Library (1918)
New Knowledge Library (1919)
Modern Achievement (1904)

1905 

Everybody's Everyday Reference Book for Home and Office (1905)
Pannell's Reference Book for Home and Office (1905)
Jack's Reference Book for Home and Office (1908)
Everett's encyclopedia of useful knowledge (1905)
Columbia Encyclopedia of Useful Knowledge (1907)
American Home Encyclopedia of Useful Knowledge (1908)

1906 
Nelson's Encyclopaedia (1906)
Harmsworth's Encyclopaedia (1906) British edition
Nelson's Perpetual Loose Leaf Encyclopaedia (1913)
New Age Encyclopedia (1920)
Harmsworth's Universal Encyclopaedia (1920) British edition
Doubleday Encyclopedia (1931), American ed. based on above
Grolier Encyclopedia (1940)
Unified Encyclopedia (1960)
Concise Universal Encyclopedia (1930), a condensed British revision of Harmworth's Universal
Modern Encyclopedia (1933) British re-issue of the above
New Popular Educator (1933) British re-issue of the above
Casell's Modern Encyclopedia (1934) British re-issue of the above
Encyclopedia of Modern Knowledge (1936) British revision of Harmworth's Universal
New Universal Encyclopedia (1951)
Nelson's Complete Encyclopedia (1937) 
Nelson's Encyclopaedia: Unabridged (1940)
Nelson's New Loose Leaf Encyclopaedia (1940)
Book of Knowledge (1959) British ed.
American People's Encyclopedia (1948)
New Standard Encyclopedia (1906) May or may not have derived from Standard American Encyclopedia (1899)
Practical and Home Encyclopedia (1909)
Standard American Encyclopedia (1912)
International's World Reference Encyclopedia (1942)
Universal World Reference Encyclopedia (1945)

1907 
Everyone's Cyclopedia (1907)
Library of Original Sources (1907)

1908 

The Children's Encyclopædia (1908)
Book of Knowledge (1912) American revision of the Children's Encyclopaedia
New Book of Knowledge (1966) later iteration of the Book of Knowledge
Standard Dictionary of Facts (1908)

1909 
La Salle Extension University Encyclopedia (1909)
Everybody's Encyclopedia (1909)
Webster's Universal Encyclopedia (1909)
Modern Universal Encyclopedia (1910)
Home and Office Reference Book of Facts (1913)
New Complete Condensed Encyclopedia (1909), a re-issue of Chandler's Encyclopedia (1898)
Werner Encyclopedia (1909), a reprint of the 9th edition of the Britannica.
Anglo-American Encyclopedia (1911)
Winston's Encyclopedia (1909)
Winston's Cumulative Loose Leaf Encyclopedia (1912)
Encyclopedia Library (1942)
American International Encyclopedia (1950)

1910s

1910 
Aiton's Encyclopedia (1910)
Standard Reference Work (1912)
National Encyclopedia for the Home, School and Library (1923)
New Standard Encyclopedia (1930)
Consolidated Encyclopedia (1939) Canadian ed.
Appleton's New Practical Encyclopedia (1910)
New Universal  Encyclopedia (1930)
Routledge's Everyman's Encyclopedia (1910)

1911 
Handy Cyclopedia of Things Worth Knowing (1911)
Volume Library (1911) (Returned to original title in 1970)
Cowles Comprehensive Encyclopedia: the Volume Library (1963)
Cowles Volume Library (1968)

1912 
Modern Encyclopedia (1912)
Standard Illustrated Book of Facts (1912)

1913 

Funk and Wagnall's Standard Encyclopedia of the Worlds Knowledge (1913)
Everyman's Encyclopaedia (1913-4)
Cambridge Encyclopedia (1934) Canadian ed.
Macmillan Everymans Encyclopedia (1958)
Home and School Reference Work (1913)
Source Book (1924)
American Reference Library (c.1931). Other recorded names included National Encyclopedia, Perpetual Loose Leaf Encyclopedia and North American Reference Book
New Encyclopedia (1913)

1914 
Human Interest Library (1914)
New Human Interest Library (1928)
Our Wonder World (1914)
New Wonder World (1932)
New Wonder World Encyclopedia (1959)
New Wonder World Cultural Library (1962)
Cultural Library (1964)
Stokes Complete One Volume Encyclopedia (1914)

1916 
Circle of Knowledge (1916)
Pictured Knowledge 1916

1917 

World Book Encyclopedia (1917)

1919 

Bufton's Universal Cyclopedia (1919)
Library of Knowledge (1929)

1920s

1920 
New Universal Handbook of Necessary Information (1920)
Universal Handbook (1920s)
Winston Universal Reference Library (1930)
Waverley New Era Encyclopedia (1920)
Waverley Encyclopedia of General Information (1930)

1921 
New Gresham Encyclopedia (1921-4)
Compact Encyclopedia (1927) 
Concise Encyclopedia (1933) also referred to as the Collins Concise Encyclopedia
The British Encyclopedia (1933)
Collins Gem Encyclopedia (1979)
Running Press Encyclopedia (1993)

1922 
Compton's Encyclopedia (1922)
Book of Knowledge (1922) British ed. Returned to this title in 1959
Cassell's Book of Knowledge
Waverley Book of Knowledge
Hammerton Book of Knowledge
Wonderland of Knowledge (1933)
New Book of Knowledge (1938-1953)

1924 

Lincoln Library of Essential Information (1924)
Encyclopedia of World Knowledge (1969)
New Lincoln Library Encyclopedia (1978)
Outline of Knowledge (1924) Link only goes to Vol. 1
New Outline of Knowledge (1936)

1925 
Concise Pocket Encyclopedia (1925)

1927 
Universal Knowledge (1927)

1928 
I See All (1928)
New Universities Encyclopedia (1928)

1929 

Pocket Library of the Worlds Essential Information (1929)

1930s

1930 
American Home Library (1930)

1931 
Funk and Wagnall's New Standard Encyclopedia of Universal Knowledge (1931)
New Funk and Wagnall's Encyclopedia (1949)
Universal Standard Encyclopedia (1954)
Funk and Wagnall's Standard Reference Encyclopedia (1959)
Funk & Wagnalls New Encyclopedia (1971)
Golden Pathway to Knowledge (1931)
Hayward's Key to Knowledge (1931)
An Outline of Modern Knowledge (1931)

1932 

National Encyclopedia  (1932)
Newnes Pictorial Encyclopedia (1932)
New Standard Encyclopedia and World Atlas (1932)
Wonder World of Knowledge (1935)
Wonder World Encyclopedia (1936)
Standard Encyclopaedia (1937)
Modern Standard Encyclopedia (1938)
New Wonder World Encyclopedia (1964)

1933 

Modern Encyclopaedia (1933) 1 vol.
Concise Encyclopaedia (1937) 8 vols.
Modern Concise Encyclopaedia (1940) 12 vols.
New Modern Encyclopaedia (1943) 1 vol.
Modern Encyclopedia for Children (1933) 
Wonder Encyclopedia for Children (1933) 
Golden Encyclopedia for Children (1934) 
Clear Type Encyclopedia (1935) 
Laural and Gold Encyclopedia (1935) 
Modern Encyclopedia for Young People (1935) 
Modern Illustrated Encyclopedia (1940)
Newes Everything Within (1933)
Newnes Golden Treasury (1933)
Children's Everything Within (1939)
New Illustrated Universal Reference Book (1933)
Richards Cyclopedia (1933)
Richard's Topical Cyclopedia (1939)

1934 
Daily Express Encyclopedia (1934)
Routledge's Universal Encyclopedia (1934) British ed.
Facts; the New Concise Encyclopedia (1934) American ed.
New Concise Pictorial Encyclopedia (1938)
Comprehensive Pictorial Encyclopedia (1942)
World Home Reference Encyclopedia (1951)
Practical Knowledge for All (1934)

1935 
Columbia Encyclopedia (1935)
The Columbia Viking Desk Encyclopedia (1953)
New Columbia Encyclopedia (1975)
News Illustrated Columbia Encyclopedia (1978)
Concise Columbia Encyclopedia (1983)
New Gem Encyclopedia (1935)
Encyclopedia of General Knowledge (1938)
New York Post Illustrated Encyclopedia
World Wide Illustrated Encyclopedia (1937)
University Illustrated Encyclopedia (1938)
New American Encyclopedia (1938)
Home University Encyclopedia (1941)
Encyclopedic Library of Knowledge (1944)
Webster's Unified Encyclopedia and Dictionary (1953)
American Family Encyclopedia (1963)

1936 
Children's Home Educator and Treasury of Knowledge (1936)
Waverley Encyclopedia (1953)
Everyday Knowledge (1936)
Hutchinson's Pictorial Encyclopedia (1936)
Hutchinson's Twentieth Century Encyclopedia (1948)
Hutchinson's New Twentieth Century Encyclopedia (1965)
New Hutchinson's Twentieth Century Encyclopedia (1977)
International Encyclopedia and Dictionary (1936)

1937 
Everybody's Enquire Within (1937)
University of Knowledge (1937)
Wonderland of Knowledge (1937)

1938 

Book of General Knowledge (1938)
Teach Yourself Concise Encyclopedia of General Knowledge (1956)
Universal Knowledge A - Z (1938)
Great Encyclopedia of Universal Knowledge (1948)

1940s

1940 
Modern Library of Knowledge (1940)
Webster's Columbia Encyclopedic Dictionary (1940)
Webster's Comprehensive Encyclopedic Dictionary (1941)
Webster's Encyclopedic Dictionary (1941)
Library of Essential Information (1942)
American People's Encyclopedia (1946)
Consolidated Webster Comprehensive Encyclopedic Dictionary (1954)
Consolidated Webster Encyclopedic Dictionary (1954)

1943 
International American Encyclopedia (1943)

1944 
Encyclopedia for Boys and Girls (1944)
Children's Illustrated Encyclopedia of General Knowledge (1957)

1946 
Golden Encyclopedia (1946)
New Golden Encyclopedia (1963)
Handy Encyclopedia of Useful Information (1946)
Austin's New Encyclopedia of Useable Information (1948)
Everyday Reference Library (1951)

1947 
Information Please Almanac (1947)

1948 
Children's Pictorial Encyclopedia (1948)
Oxford Junior Encyclopedia (1948)
American Oxford Encyclopedia for Home and School (1964)
World of the Children (1948)
Caxton Encyclopedia (1960)
Caxton World of Knowledge (1961)
New World Library (1964)

1949 
Children's Guide to Knowledge (1949) British version
Collier's Encyclopedia (1949 - 1951)

1950s

1953 
Odham's Encyclopedia (1953)
Modern Encyclopedia (1961)

1954 
Basic Everyday Encyclopedia (1954)
Illustrated Encyclopedia of Knowledge (1954)
Illustrated Home Library Encyclopedia (1955)
Illustrated World Encyclopedia (1958)
New Pictorial Encyclopedia of the World (1954)
Illustrated Encyclopedia of the Modern World (1956)
Little & Ives Illustrated Ready Reference Encyclopedia (1961)
New Wonder Book Cyclopedia of World Knowledge (1954)

1955 
New Masters Pictorial Encyclopedia (1955)
Our Wonderful World (1955)

1956 
Wonder Book Encyclopedia (1956)
Junior Pictorial Encyclopedia (1959)
Encyclopedia of Modern Knowledge (1965)
Young Children's Encyclopedia (1956)

1957 
Children's Guide to Knowledge (1957) American version
Modern Children's Library of Knowledge (1957)
Modern University Encyclopedia (1957)
New Age Encyclopedia, World Atlas and Sports Supplement (1957)
Pearson's Everything Within (1957)
Pictorial Encyclopedia (1957)

1959 
Children's Encyclopaedia (1959)
Funk and Wagnall's New Standard Encyclopedia of Universal Knowledge (1959) a 1 vol. condensation of Funk and Wagnell's Standard Reference Encyclopedia
Golden Book Encyclopedia (1959)
Illustrated Encyclopedia (1959)

1960s

1960 
Junior World Encyclopedia (1960)
Harver Junior World Encyclopedia (1972)
Newnes Popular Encyclopedia (1960)
Newnes Family Encyclopedia (1966)

1961 
Black's Children Encyclopedia (1961)
Golden Home and High School Encyclopedia (1961)
Golden Treasury of Knowledge (1961)
Junior Pears Encyclopedia (1961)
Knowledge: the weekly colored encyclopedia (1961 - 1965)
New Knowledge (1965)
Odham's Encyclopedia for Children (1961)
Odham's Wonder World of Knowledge (1961)

1963 
Encyclopedia International (1963-4)
Grolier Universal Encyclopedia (1965)

1964 
Child's First Encyclopedia (1964)
Complete Reference Handbook (1964)
Quick Reference Encyclopedia (1976)
Quick Reference Handbook of Basic Knowledge (1979)

1965 
Catholic Encyclopedia for School and Home (1965)
The Penguin Encyclopedia (1965)

1966 
Purnell's New English Encyclopedia (1966)
New Caxton Encyclopedia (1966)

1967 
World Wide Encyclopedia (1967)
Merit Students Encyclopedia (1967)

1968 
Longmans English Larousse (1968)

1970s

1971 
Compton's Young Children's Precyclopedia (1971)
Comton's Precyclopedia (1973)
Talking Cassette Encyclopedia (1971)
New Talking Cassette Encyclopedia (1984)

1972 
Young Student's Encyclopedia (1972)

1973 
Cadillac Modern Encyclopedia (1973)
Kussmaul Encyclopedia (1981)
Disney's Wonderful World of Knowledge (1973)
Harver World Encyclopedia (1973)

1976 
Ward Lock Children's Encyclopedia (1976)
Rand McNally's Children's Encyclopedia (1976)

1977 
The Random House Encyclopedia (1977)
University Desk Encyclopedia (1977)
Concord Desk Encyclopedia (1981)

1978 
Junior Encyclopedia of General Knowledge (1978)

1979 
Knowledge Encyclopedia (1979)
Purnell's Pictorial Encyclopedia (1979)

1980s

1980 
Academic American Encyclopedia (1980)
Barnes & Noble New American Encyclopedia (1991)
Charlie Brown's 'Cyclopedia (1980)
Finding Out: Silver Burdett's Children's Encyclopedia (1980)
Nelson's Encyclopedia for Young Readers (1980)

1981 
Macmillan Encyclopedia (1981)
New Universal Family Encyclopedia (1985)
New Knowledge Library (1981)

1985 
Oxford Illustrated Encyclopedia (1985)

1990s

1991 
American Spectrum Encyclopedia (1991)

1993 
Encarta (1993)

Britannica 
Tenth edition (supplement to the 9th) (1903)
11th edition of the Encyclopaedia Britannica (1910-1)
Twelfth edition (1922) a 3-volume supplement to the eleventh edition was released that summarized the developments just before, during and after World War I; these three volumes, taken together with the eleventh edition of 1910, became known as the twelfth edition.
These eventful years; the twentieth century in the making, as told by many of its makers; being the dramatic story of all that has happened throughout the world during the most momentous period in all history, (1924)
Thirteenth edition (1926) three new volumes covering the history of 1910–1926, which were intended to supplant those of the twelfth edition. Again taken together with the eleventh edition, the new volumes became known as the thirteenth edition.
Fourteenth edition (1929) after this the Britannica began a policy of continuous revision.
10 Eventful Years (1947) a special supplement on 1937-1947 - the Second World War, as well as the years immediately preceding it and following it.
Fifteenth edition, first version, other wise known as the New Encyclopædia Britannica (1974) this began the change of format into Propædia, Micropædia, and Macropædia, as well as eschewing an index.
Fifteenth edition, second version (1985) restored the index as a two volume supplement, streamlined the three type format for easier use. 
Encyclopædia Britannica Ultimate Reference Suite (2004)
Britannica Global Edition (2010)

Other English language Britannica publications 
The Historians' History of the World (1902)
The reader's guide to the Encyclopædia britannica; a handbook containing sixty-six courses of systematic study or occasional reading. (1913)
Britannica Book of the Year (1913, 1938-)
The Britannica book of the war (1914)
Britannica Home University (1920)
Weedon's Modern Encyclopedia (1931) a non-Britannica publication that was bought out and repackaged by Britannica as
Britannica Junior (1934)
Great Books of the Western World (1952)
Children's Britannica (1960) aimed at ages seven to 14.
Gateway to the Great Books (1963)
Young Children's Encyclopaedia (1970)  for children just learning to read
My First Britannica (1974) aimed at children ages six to 12
Britannica Discovery Library (1974) for children aged three to six

See also 
History of the Encyclopædia Britannica

 
English
English-language encyclopedias